Lake Chervonoye is a large freshwater lake in the Zhytkavichy Raion, Gomel Oblast of Belarus.

The lake is used for fishery and is the third largest lake in Belarus.

References 

Chervonoye
Geography of Gomel Region